Dennis Biddle is a former Negro leagues professional baseball player who played for the Chicago American Giants. Biddle is most known for making his debut in 1953 as the Giants' pitcher when he was only 17 years old.

Biddle injured his ankle the next year; this ultimately ended his playing career. In 1996, Biddle founded Yesterday's Negro League Baseball Players, LLC.

Biddle appeared in Milwaukee, Wisconsin on July 24, 2021 before a regular season MLB game at American Family Field in support of the Milwaukee Brewers. Biddle conducted an interview prior to the opening pitch.

References 

1935 births
Living people
Baseball pitchers
Baseball players from Arkansas
People from Magnolia, Arkansas
Chicago American Giants players
21st-century African-American people